Munboksan is a mountain located in Gyeongju, North Gyeongsang Province and Cheongdo County, South Korea. It is part of the Yeongnam Alps mountain range.

See also
Geography of Korea
List of mountains in Korea
List of mountains by elevation
Mountain portal
South Korea portal

References

External links
 Official website for the Yeongnam Alps

Mountains of North Gyeongsang Province
Gyeongju
Cheongdo County
Mountains of South Korea
One-thousanders of South Korea